Lust In Space – Live At The National is a live DVD by the American heavy metal band Gwar, recorded at The National theater in Richmond, Virginia on October 23, 2009 during the band's Lust in Space tour. It was released on June 26, 2010 under Don Drakulich's Hypereal Productions label. Bonuses include a 10-minute "Behind The Murder" mockumentary.

Track listing
"Metal Metal Land"
"Saddam a Go-Go"
"Lords and Masters"
"The Apes of Wrath"
"Tormentor"
"Where is Zog?"
"Womb With a View"
"Let Us Slay"
"Maggots"
"Immortal Corruptor"
"The Price of Peace"
"Lust in Space"
"Bring Back the Bomb"
"Have You Seen Me?"
"Sick of You"

Personnel
Dave Brockie (Oderus Urungus) - lead vocals
Cory Smoot (Flattus Maximus) - lead guitar, backing vocals
Mike Derks (Balsac the Jaws of Death) - rhythm guitar, backing vocals
Casey Orr (Beefcake the Mighty) - bass, backing vocals, lead vocals on "The Price of Peace"
Brad Roberts (Jizmak Da Gusha) - drums, percussion

References

Live video albums
2010 video albums
Gwar video albums
2010 live albums